Diospyros simaloerensis is a tree in the family Ebenaceae. The twigs dry to a greyish colour. Inflorescences bear up to five flowers. The tree is named for Simaloer island in Sumatra. Its habitat is lowland mixed dipterocarp forests from sea level to  altitude. Diospyros simaloerensis is native to Sumatra and Borneo.

References

simaloerensis
Plants described in 1933
Trees of Sumatra
Trees of Borneo